François Viellard-Migeon (1803-1886) was a French politician. He served in the Corps législatif from 1869 to 1870, and in the French Senate from 1876 to 1886.

Early life
François Viellard-Migeon was born on 21 November 1803 in Belfort, Haut-Rhin, France.

Career
Viellard-Migeon was an ironmaster in Morvillars. He served in the Corps législatif from 1869 to 1870, and in the French Senate from 1876 to 1886.

Death
Vieillard-Migeon died on 2 October 1886 in Giromagny, Haut-Rhin, France.

References

1803 births
1886 deaths
Politicians from Belfort
Members of the 4th Corps législatif of the Second French Empire
French Senators of the Third Republic
Senators of Territoire de Belfort
French ironmasters
19th-century ironmasters